In different sports an athlete who wins five crowns, titles, medals, belts, or other distinctions is called a Quintuple Champion.

Boxing

In boxing, a quintuple champion is a boxer who has won world titles in at least five different weight classes.

The first man in boxing to earn this distinction was Thomas Hearns on November 4, 1988. Hearns won first the Welterweight (147 lbs) title, later annexed the Super Welterweight (154 lbs) belt. Rather than win the next closest division in weight, the Middleweight (160 lbs), he moved up three divisions to earn the Light Heavyweight (175 lbs) title. He moved down in weight to net the Middleweight (160 lbs) crown and finally moved back in weight up to Super Middleweight (168 lbs) to become the first Quintuple Champion in the history of boxing.

Since then some boxers have won six titles and become the Sextuple champions.

World's Strongest Man
Mariusz Pudzianowski is the only man to have won the World's Strongest Man title five times.

Formula One
Juan Manuel Fangio is a five-time Formula One World Champion.

Motorcycle racing
Mick Doohan won five consecutive 500 cc World Championships starting in 1994.

See also
List of boxing triple champions
List of boxing quadruple champions
List of boxing quintuple champions
List of boxing sextuple champions
List of boxing septuple champions
Octuple champion
List of The Ring world champions
List of WBC world champions
List of WBA world champions
List of IBF world champions
List of WBO world champions
List of IBO world champions

External links

Boxing champions